The Embassy of the State of Israel in the Philippines is at the 11th Floor of Avecshares Center, 1132 University Parkway North, Bonifacio Global City in Taguig. The permanent mission of Israel in the Philippines has been representing the country since the year 1962.

The current ambassador of Israel to the Philippines is Ambassador Ilan Fluss.

Historical background 
When Adolf Hitler became the chancellor of Germany in January 1933, he initiated the killing of almost six million Jews.
 
More than a thousand of German and Austrian Jews escaped to the Philippines when no other country accepted them. The rescue strategy was decided while playing cards and smoking cigars by three men: President Manuel L. Quezon, Paul McNutt and Frieder family. President Quezon opened the country's doors to the fleeing refugees as "it was the right thing to do". McNutt, who was the American High Commissioner to the Philippines, jeopardized his career as he persuaded the US government to issue thousands of working visas for the Jews, while the Frieder brothers, provided jobs in their own cigar factory. He and his brothers also raised money for the Jews' transport to Manila and established shelters and schools.

Establishment of Relationship 
In 1947, the Philippines was one of the 33 countries and the only Asian country who voted for the UN Resolution 181 referring to the  partition of Palestine and the creation of the State of Israel. A Treaty of Friendship was signed on February 26, 1958 indicating full diplomatic relations between the two nations. The Philippine and Israel embassies were both opened in 1962, in Manila and Tel Aviv respectively. A Memorandum of Understanding (MOU) was signed by both countries in 1997, establishing bilateral ties in economy, education, trade, science, and tourism.

Today 
The good relations and cooperation between the State of Israel and the Republic of the Philippines is continuously growing. Various agreements between the countries have been signed and are being operated. The most recently signed agreement is the “Air Service Agreement” in which the number of flights was increased. The agreement also enabled Tel Aviv to be a stopover point on flights to Europe.

 Investors from Israel consider the Philippines as a viable investment site and are promoting the country as the best in Southeast Asia. Among the Israeli companies that invested in the Philippines are Amdocs Limited, ECI Telecom LTD and Vishay Intertechnology have already invested in the Philippines. Currently, there are about $200 million worth of bilateral contracts between the two countries. The Israel Chamber of Commerce in the Philippines, meanwhile, would like to focus more on tourism and plans to triple the bilateral contracts in the coming years.

The strong cultural relation between the two countries can be seen in the different events and activities organized by the embassy. Some of the major events annually promoted by the embassy are the Israeli Film Festival (every fourth quarter of the year); the National Day of Israel held (every second quarter of the year); participation to the Philippine International Jazz and Arts Festival. The embassy has also brought Israeli artists to the Philippines such as the director Tomer Heymann; choreographer Ido Tadmor; musicians Guy Mentesh and Yahel Doron.

As of 2013, an estimated number of 31,000 Filipinos are residing in Israel.  Most of the Filipino migrants work as caregivers while a small portion works in hotels and restaurants. However, despite the close association of Filipinos being caregivers in Israel, Rose “Osang” Fostanes proved that Filipinos are talented and have so much in store. Osang came to Israel in 2008 to work as a caregiver. After six years of residing to the country, on January 14 of 2014, she won the first season of “X-Factor Israel” –this became possible with the enormous support given to her by the people of Israel. Furthermore, two documentary films focusing on Filipino workers based in Israel were shown in the Philippines and Israel –Transit and Paperdolls.“Transit” (2013) is a Philippine independent film about the challenges of Filipino families living outside the country, as well as the dilemma of identities of two Filipino children living in Israel. On the other hand, the film “Paperdolls” (2006) is a documentary film by Tomer Heymann, an Israeli award-winning filmmaker. The film is about a community of transvestite Filipinos who make a living in Israel as live-in care givers 6 days a week and as a group of drag performers on their free night –in which they are called “the paperdolls”.

In November 2013, the strongest recorded tropical cyclone in history, typhoon Haiyan hit the Philippines. The Israeli government, after hearing the devastating news, immediately sent a team of 148-member from the Israel Defense Forces (IDF) assisted by the Ministry of Foreign Affairs (MFA).  The government also reconstructed buildings, restored water supply, and set up a field hospital to provide immediate medical response such as delivery of babies, perform surgeries and treatment of more than 2,800 victims. They also conducted search and rescue operations and sent relief goods for the people affected by the disaster. Numerous organizations and institutions from Israel likewise helped the victims of the typhoon such as IsraAID (Israel forum for international Humanitarian Aid), Boys town Jerusalem, Israeli Relief Coalition and other volunteers from Israel has sent medical assistance to the victims.

MASHAV (Agency for International Development) 
MASHAV is Israel's international development cooperation program. It was launched in 1957 with the purpose of spreading knowledge and related technologies which helped in the country's rapid development. The programs which Mashav prioritize today include poverty alleviation, empowerment of women, education services, assistance in agricultural methods, and other humanitarian projects. Since its establishment, the program has trained close to 270,000 course participants from 132 countries –including the Philippines.

Various  MASHAV courses are being offered in the Philippines. Recently, the program offered new courses for the country which includes: International Training on Clean Technologies, Course on Developing and Organizing a Trauma System and MCS Organization, Feeding the Future: Food Safety and Technology in times of Global Change and Commercial Beekeeping in Modern Agriculture. Moreover, the program keeps its contacts with former course applicants for them to be part of the “ Shalom Club” –it serves as forum for all MASHAV alumni. There are over 70 shalom clubs worldwide in which the members are encouraged to participate in social and professional activities, to attend fund-raising events, lectures ranging from AIDS education and business management and exchange ideas about a certain issue. The embassy of Israel in Manila is a partner of the Shalom Club in the Philippines. Their goal is to seek human and sustainable development, as well as to improve bilateral relations of the two countries. The main activities conducted by the club are feeding programs and donation missions.

PICAT (Philippine-Israel Center for Agricultural Training) 
The Center for International Cooperation (MASHAV) and the Center for International Agricultural Development Cooperation (CINADCO) of Israel, together with Central Luzon State University (CLSU), Department of Agrarian Reform (DAR), and Nueva Ecija Provincial Government of Philippines formed the PICAT Project on June 19, 2006. Its main purpose is to establish an agricultural training center that would stimulate better farm productivity, sustainability and profitability for the families in the region of Nueva Ecija, and then was launched in other provinces such as Bulacan, Tarlac, and Pampanga.

See also
Israel-Philippines relations

References

http://rescueinthephilippines.com/
https://www.jewishvirtuallibrary.org/jsource/Holocaust/history.html
https://web.archive.org/web/20131021102436/http://newsinfo.inquirer.net/inquirerheadlines/nation/view/20090628-212784/Monument-in-Israel-honors-Filipinos
http://www.worldrecordacademy.com/biggest/largest_flag_world_record_set_by_Israeli_Flag_70932.htm
http://www.anglo-list.com
https://web.archive.org/web/20131217174453/http://www.cinemalaya.org/films/new-breed/transit
http://www.iccp.ph/history-of-philippine-israel-relations.html
http://unitedwithisrael.org/philippines/

External links 
 Israel Embassy in Manila
 MASHAV in the Philippines
 The Philippine Embassy to Israel Official Webpage
 Israel Ministry of Foreign Affairs
 
 

Israel–Philippines relations
Israel
Manila
1962 establishments in the Philippines
Bonifacio Global City